Villa Hidalgo Municipality  is a municipality, in the north-east of the Mexican state of Sonora.

Municipal seat
It was founded by the Jesuit missionary Marcos del Río in 1644 as (San Ignacio de) Oputo. On 1 April 1967 the State Congress ordered that it change its name from Oputo to its current name in honor of Mexican patriot Miguel Hidalgo.

Area
The municipal area is 951.17 km2.

Population
The population was 1,986 inhabitants (2.05 inhab./km2) in 2000.

Economy
The main economic activities are agriculture and cattle raising.

References

External links
Villa Hidalgo, Sonora (Enciclopedia de los Municipios de México)

Municipalities of Sonora
1644 establishments in the Spanish Empire